Chionelasmus is a genus of symmetrical sessile barnacles in the family Chionelasmatidae. There are at least two described species in Chionelasmus.

Species
These species belong to the genus Chionelasmus:
 Chionelasmus crosnieri Buckeridge, 1998
 Chionelasmus darwini (Pilsbry, 1907)

References

External links

 

Barnacles